European Parliament elections were held in Denmark on 9 June 1994 to elect the 16 Danish members of the European Parliament.

Results
Seats were allocated first by the D'Hondt method to Electoral coalitions (Danish Social Liberal Party and Christian People's Party; Venstre, Conservative People's Party and Centre Democrats; June Movement and People's Movement against the EU) and the remaining parties by themselves; then subsequently between the parties in each coalition.

References

Denmark
European Parliament elections in Denmark
Europe